María Edith Sigala López (born 16 June 1976) is a Mexican para table tennis player who competes in international level events. She is a triple Parapan American Games champion and four-time Pan American champion. She has also participated at the 2012 and 2016 Summer Paralympics.

References

1976 births
Living people
Sportspeople from Guadalajara, Jalisco
Paralympic table tennis players of Mexico
Table tennis players at the 2012 Summer Paralympics
Table tennis players at the 2016 Summer Paralympics
Medalists at the 2007 Parapan American Games
Medalists at the 2011 Parapan American Games
Medalists at the 2015 Parapan American Games
Medalists at the 2019 Parapan American Games
Table tennis players at the 2020 Summer Paralympics
Mexican female table tennis players
20th-century Mexican women
21st-century Mexican women